Eugenia Tanaka (born 9 March 1987 in Kisaran, North Sumatra, Indonesia) is an Indonesian-born Australian badminton player. At the age of fourteen, Tanaka moved to Melbourne, Australia, where she started playing badminton. Tanaka is also a member of Badminton Academy of Victoria, and is coached and trained by Ricky Yu.

Tanaka qualified for the women's doubles at the 2008 Summer Olympics in Beijing, by placing fifteenth and receiving a continental spot for Oceania from the Badminton World Federation's ranking list. Tanaka and her partner Tania Luiz lost the preliminary round match to Japanese pair Miyuki Maeda and Satoko Suetsuna, with a score of 4–21 and 8–21.

Achievements

Oceania Championships
Women's doubles

Mixed doubles

BWF International Challenge/Series
Women's doubles

Mixed doubles

  BWF International Challenge tournament
  BWF International Series tournament
  BWF Future Series tournament

References

External links
Profile – Australian Olympic Team
NBC Olympics Profile

1987 births
Australian female badminton players
Australian people of Chinese descent
Living people
Olympic badminton players of Australia
Badminton players at the 2008 Summer Olympics
Indonesian emigrants to Australia
Indonesian people of Chinese descent
Sportspeople from North Sumatra
Sportspeople from Melbourne
Sportswomen from Victoria (Australia)